Peter Garza (born August 6, 1960) is a United States computer forensics expert and cybercrime investigator.

As a Special Agent with the Naval Criminal Investigative Service, Peter Garza conducted the first court-ordered Internet wiretap in the United States while investigating the Julio Cesar Ardita ("El Griton") hacking case.  Ardita was charged by the U.S. Justice Department with using compromised user accounts at Harvard University to hack into government and university computer systems in the U.S. and abroad.  Ardita pleaded guilty on May 19, 1998 in the United States District Court of Massachusetts to unlawfully intercepting electronic communications and damaging files on military computer systems.

Garza founded EvidentData, Inc., a private sector consulting firm specializing in computer forensics, electronic discovery, and expert consulting, in 1999.  EvidentData was acquired by First Advantage which he left in 2009 to form Data Forté.  Garza continues to be involved in many high-profile civil cases. He gave expert testimony regarding altered electronic documents in a case (Beckman Coulter Inc. v. Dovatron International Inc.) which resulted in a $934 million jury award and testified regarding critical deleted but recoverable data in a case (Steinberg, Moorad & Dunn, Inc. v. Dunn) brought by sports agent Leigh Steinberg against former partner David Dunn which resulted in a $45 million jury award.

Peter Garza earned a Master of Science in Information Systems from Claremont Graduate University in 2001.  He also developed and taught a graduate course in Computer Forensics at California State Polytechnic University, Pomona.

External links 
Article regarding Ben Roethlisberger case
Fortune Small Business article discussing Peter Garza's work
Article regarding the Julio Cesar Ardita hacking case from Informit
Department of Justice press release regarding first Internet wiretap
Department of Justice press release regarding Julio Cesar Ardita guilty plea
Article regarding Beckman Coulter Inc. v. Dovatron International Inc.
Article regarding Steinberg, Moorad & Dunn, Inc. v. Dunn

Computer security specialists
Living people
1960 births